Olarevo is a rural locality (a village) in Prigorodnoye Rural Settlement, Sokolsky District, Vologda Oblast, Russia. The population was 226 as of 2002.

Geography 
Olarevo is located 16 km southwest of Sokol (the district's administrative centre) by road. Severovo is the nearest rural locality.

References 

Rural localities in Sokolsky District, Vologda Oblast
Vologodsky Uyezd